Aaron Christopher Ramsdale (born 14 May 1998) is an English professional footballer who plays as a goalkeeper for  club Arsenal and the England national team.

Ramsdale began his senior club career playing for Sheffield United and signed for AFC Bournemouth in 2017. Following successive loans to Chesterfield and AFC Wimbledon, Ramsdale played a season with Bournemouth and re-joined Sheffield United in a transfer worth an initial £18 million. In 2021, Ramsdale signed for Arsenal in a club record transfer worth up to £30 million, becoming their most expensive goalkeeper.

Ramsdale has represented England at all levels from under-18 to the senior team, and won the UEFA European Under-19 Championship in 2017, and was in the squad that finished as runners-up at UEFA Euro 2020.

Early life
Ramsdale was born in Stoke-on-Trent, Staffordshire and was raised in the nearby village of Chesterton. Ramsdale began his career at Newcastle-under-Lyme-based club Marsh Town. Goalkeeping coach Fred Barber took him up to Bolton Wanderers for a trial and they ended up signing him. In 2014, Ramsdale was identified by The Sentinel as a future prospect after helping his school, Sir Thomas Boughey High School, to reach the English Schools' FA Cup semi-final.

Club career

Sheffield United
In 2013, Ramsdale joined Sheffield United after time spent in the Bolton Wanderers youth team. After graduating from Sheffield United's youth academy, Ramsdale signed a scholarship with the club in May 2014. In December 2015, he briefly joined Northern Counties East Football League Premier Division club Worksop Town on loan, playing one match while their regular goalkeeper was suspended. After returning to the Blades, Ramsdale appeared twice as an unused substitute during the 2015–16 season against Coventry City and Scunthorpe United. In May 2016, he signed his first professional contract with the club.

Ramsdale made his professional debut starting in a 6–0 home victory over Leyton Orient in the FA Cup, keeping a clean sheet in the process. He also made another appearance in the FA Cup against Bolton Wanderers but lost 3–2.

AFC Bournemouth
On 31 January 2017, Ramsdale was signed by Premier League club AFC Bournemouth for an undisclosed fee believed to be in the region of £800,000. He was on the bench for the final game of the 2016–17 season against Leicester City.

Ramsdale made both his Premier League debut and his full debut for Bournemouth on the opening day of the 2019–20 season, in a 1–1 draw against former team Sheffield United. Ramsdale established himself as Bournemouth's first choice keeper in the first few months of the 2019–20 season, starting every Premier League game for the club until 12 January, when he missed the match against Watford due to injury. He returned to the team in the next Premier League game, a 1–0 loss to Norwich City.

He signed a new, long-term contract with the club in October 2019. That same month, Ramsdale's form saw him win the club's Player of the Month award for October, keeping clean sheets in the games against Norwich City and Watford. His form continued in the next few months, as he again picked up the club's Player of the Month award in January for another string of excellent performances, including a Man of the Match winning display against Brighton & Hove Albion. On 10 August, Ramsdale was named Player of the Year by the club's supporters.

Loans to Chesterfield and Wimbledon
In the January 2018 transfer window, Ramsdale was loaned out to Chesterfield for the rest of the 2017–18 season. Ramsdale made his Chesterfield debut against Accrington Stanley on 6 January 2018, but scored an own goal after he "allowed a seemingly harmless Jackson strike from the right to squirm into the net", in a 4–0 loss. A week later, against Luton Town, he kept a clean sheet in a 2–0 win. In the 2017–18 season, Ramsdale made 19 appearances in total for the club in League Two, but was ultimately unable to help prevent the club from suffering relegation to the National League.

On 4 January 2019, Ramsdale joined AFC Wimbledon on loan until the end of the 2018–19 season. The next day, Ramsdale made his debut for the Dons in a 3–2 FA Cup third round victory over Fleetwood Town at the Highbury Stadium in Fleetwood. His league debut came a week later in a 1–1 draw with Coventry City at the Ricoh Arena. He helped the club defeat West Ham in the FA Cup. In the 2018–19 season, Ramsdale made 20 appearances in total for the club in League One, and in doing so he won the club's Young Player of the Season Award for his performances in goal, as Wimbledon achieved survival in League One despite being 10 points from safety in February.

Return to Sheffield United
On 19 August 2020, Ramsdale rejoined Sheffield United, for a reported fee of £18.5 million on a four-year deal. In May 2021, he was named Sheffield United's Player of the Year and Young Player of the Year after being ever present between the sticks all season.

Arsenal
On 20 August 2021, Ramsdale signed for Premier League club Arsenal on a long-term contract. He made his debut away to West Bromwich Albion in the 2021–22 EFL Cup five days later, and kept a clean sheet as Arsenal won 6–0. He made his Premier League debut on 11 September and kept another clean sheet as Arsenal defeated Norwich City 1–0 at the Emirates Stadium. After a run of clean sheets in the league, he conceded his first goal in a 3–1 home win against Tottenham Hotspur in the North London derby on 26 September. In a 2–0 away win against Leicester City on 30 October, he was highly praised for one of his saves and overall performance by pundits including former Manchester United goalkeeper Peter Schmeichel, who described his save from a James Maddison free-kick as the "best save I've seen for years". In November 2021, following a string of impressive performances, Ramsdale was one of eight players to be nominated for the Premier League's Player of the Month Award for October, though it was eventually awarded to Liverpool's Mohamed Salah. He was also named Arsenal's Player of the Month for October 2021, with 60% of the votes from the club's supporters. He won the award again in November with 42% of the votes. Following the departure of Bernd Leno at the beginning of the 2022–23 season, Ramsdale took the number one shirt at Arsenal.

On 15 January 2023, Ramsdale was subject of an incident when a Tottenham fan tried to kick him in the back following Arsenal's 2–0 win against Tottenham in North London derby. Afterward, FA confirmed that they are work together with the police, the relevant authorities and the clubs to ensure the appropriate action is taken. Two days later, a 35-year-old man from Hackney was charged of assault and throwing a missile on to pitch. A month later, he was given a four-year football banning order and was handed a 12-month community order.

On 13 March, Ramsdale won the Goalkeeper of the Year award at the 2023 London Football Awards.

International career

Youth
Ramsdale has represented England at Under 18, Under 19, Under 20 and Under 21 level.

He was first called up by England U18 in March 2016 and made his debut for the team in a 4–1 win over Republic of Ireland U18 on 27 March 2016. He went on to make two appearances for the England U18 team.

In August 2016, Ramsdale was called up by England U19, where he made his debut on 4 September 2016, in a 1–0 loss against Belgium U19. Ramsdale started all five games for the England under-19 team that won the 2017 UEFA European Under-19 Championship and kept three clean sheets in five matches during the tournament.

After winning the UEFA European U19-Championship, Ramsdale was called up by England U20 in August 2017, where he made his debut on 4 September 2017, in a 0–0 draw against Switzerland U20.

On 18 May 2018, Ramsdale received a call up to England U21s for the first time by Manager Aidy Boothroyd, for the Toulon Tournament. Ramsdale received his first cap for the England U21 team on 1 June 2018, playing the full 90 minutes in a 4–0 win against Qatar. Ramsdale was first choice goalkeeper during qualifiers for the 2021 UEFA European Under-21 Championship and also started all three games for England as they were eliminated at the group stage of that tournament.

Senior team
On 25 May 2021, Ramsdale was called up as part of Gareth Southgate's 33-man provisional senior squad for the delayed UEFA Euro 2020. He was not named in the final 26-man squad, with goalkeepers Dean Henderson, Sam Johnstone and Jordan Pickford being selected ahead of him, but was called up to the squad one game into the tournament after Henderson withdrew with an injury. Ramsdale made his debut for the senior squad starting in a 10–0 away victory against San Marino during the 2022 World Cup qualifiers on 15 November 2021. In November 2022, Ramsdale was named in Gareth Southgate's 26-man squad for the 2022 FIFA World Cup held in Qatar.

Personal life
Ramsdale is a West Bromwich Albion fan, and cited an admiration for their former keeper Ben Foster when he played against him in 2019.

Career statistics

Club

International

Honours
England U19
UEFA European Under-19 Championship: 2017

England U21
Toulon Tournament: 2018

England
UEFA European Championship runner-up: 2020

Individual
AFC Bournemouth Supporters' Player of the Year: 2019–20
Sheffield United Player of the Year: 2020–21
Sheffield United Young Player of the Year: 2020–21
London Football Awards: Goalkeeper of the Year: 2023

References

External links

Profile at the Arsenal F.C. website
Profile at the Football Association website

1998 births
Living people
Footballers from Stoke-on-Trent
English footballers
Association football goalkeepers
Bolton Wanderers F.C. players
Worksop Town F.C. players
Sheffield United F.C. players
AFC Bournemouth players
Chesterfield F.C. players
AFC Wimbledon players
Arsenal F.C. players
Northern Counties East Football League players
English Football League players
Premier League players
England youth international footballers
England under-21 international footballers
England international footballers
UEFA Euro 2020 players
2022 FIFA World Cup players
English victims of crime